İkinci Udullu (also, Dzhangyan-Udulu, Dzhankend, Uduli Vtoryye, and Udullu Vtoroye) is a village and municipality in the Hajigabul Rayon of Azerbaijan.  It has a population of 1,295.

References 

Populated places in Hajigabul District